Old Heidelberg (German: Alt Heidelberg) is a 1923 German silent drama film directed by Hans Behrendt and starring Paul Hartmann, Eva May and Werner Krauss. It was based on the 1901 play of the same name by Wilhelm Meyer-Förster.

Cast
Paul Hartmann as Erbprinz Karl Heinz 
Eva May as Kaethi 
Werner Krauss as Dr. Jüttner 
Eugen Burg as Lutz, Kammerdiener 
Eugen Rex as Kellermann, Corpsdiener 
Willy Prager   
Karl Harbacher   
Fritz Wendhausen   
Victor Colani   
Albert Bassermann

References

External links

Films of the Weimar Republic
German silent feature films
German drama films
Films directed by Hans Behrendt
Films set in Heidelberg
Films set in the 19th century
Films about princes
1923 drama films
German films based on plays
Remakes of American films
UFA GmbH films
German black-and-white films
Silent drama films
1920s German films
1920s German-language films